Xu Yaoyuan (born December 1952) is a retired general of the Chinese People's Liberation Army (PLA). He served as Political Commissar of the PLA Academy of Military Science and was a member of the 18th Central Committee of the Chinese Communist Party.

Biography 
Xu was born in Wujiang County, Jiangsu in December 1952. He enlisted in the PLA in 1969, and served in the 23rd Army. In 1997 he entered the PLA General Political Department (GPD); in 2004 he was put in charge of the cadres department of the GPD. In 2007 he became assistant to the director of the Department. In 2010 he attained the rank of lieutenant general, and became Political Commissar of the People's Armed Police. In July 2012 he was promoted to full general. In December 2014, Xu replaced General Sun Sijing as Political Commissar of the PLA Academy of Military Science.

References

1952 births
Living people
People's Liberation Army generals from Jiangsu
Politicians from Suzhou
Members of the 18th Central Committee of the Chinese Communist Party
Political commissars of the People's Armed Police
Political commissars of the PLA Academy of Military Science
Chinese Communist Party politicians from Jiangsu
People's Republic of China politicians from Jiangsu